The 2011 ATP China Challenger International was a professional tennis tournament played on hard courts. It was the first edition of the tournament which was part of the 2011 ATP Challenger Tour. It took place in Wuhai, China between 25 and 31 July 2011.

ATP entrants

Seeds

 1 Rankings are as of July 18, 2011.

Other entrants
The following players received wildcards into the singles main draw:
  Wang Chuhan
  Li Dawei
  Ma Yanan
  Lu Yang

The following players received entry from the qualifying draw:
  An Jae-sung
  Lee Hsin-han
  Kento Takeuchi
  Kittipong Wachiramanowong

The following players received entry from the qualifying draw as a lucky loser:
  Gao Peng

Champions

Singles

 Go Soeda def.  Raven Klaasen, 7–5, 6–4

Doubles

 Lee Hsin-han /  Yang Tsung-hua def.  Feng He /  Zhang Ze, 6–2, 7–6(7–4)

External links
Official website
ITF Search
ATP official site

ATP China
2011